Orbit is the name given to Major League Baseball's Houston Astros mascot, a lime-green alien wearing an Astros jersey with antennae extending into baseballs. Orbit was the team's official mascot from the 1990 through the 1999 seasons until the 2000 season, where Junction Jack was introduced as the team's mascot with the move from the Astrodome to then Enron Field. Orbit returned on November 2, 2012, at the unveiling of the Astros new look for their 2013 debut in the American League. The name Orbit pays homage to Houston's association with NASA and nickname Space City.

History
In April 1977, the Astros introduced their first mascot, Chester Charge.  At that time there was only one other mascot in major league baseball, which was the San Diego Chicken.  Chester Charge was a 45-pound costume of a cartoon Texas cavalry soldier on a horse.  Chester appeared on the field at the beginning of each home game, during the seventh inning stretch and then ran around the bases at the conclusion of each win. At the blast of a bugle, the scoreboard would light up and the audience would yell, “Charge!”  The first Chester Charge was played by Steve Ross who was then an 18-year-old Senior High School student.

Following a visit to then the AAA-Astros affiliate, the Tucson Toros in 1989, former team marketing Vice President Ted Haracz sought to bring the Toros' mascot, Tuffy to Houston to serve as the team's mascot. Although Tuffy was not promoted from Tucson, Hal Katzman, who performed as Tuffy was invited by the team to serve as Orbit for the 1990 season. The development of a team mascot for the 1990 season was viewed by the team as an important piece in its community outreach programs, specifically with children. John Sorrentino was the newly appointed Director of Community Relations.  Sorrentino became instrumental in the design phase of the mascot costume as well as the design of the community outreach program.  Sorrentino was able to form a partnership with the FBI and its director, William Sessions to create a "Stay in School, Stay Drug Free" to elementary schools in the Houston area. Both the naming and design of the mascot were established from suggestion from Houston-area schoolchildren. The design for Orbit was derived from more than 10,000 children's drawings submitted to the Astros, with the final design being a composite of the various drawings submitted. The first public appearance of Orbit occurred in January 1990 at Heflin Elementary School.

One of the more notable incidents involving Orbit occurred when umpire Gary Darling ejected the mascot from the game for arguing balls and strikes. In addition to his role as the Astros' mascot, Orbit made a one-time appearance as "Marty the Mariner Martian" during a "Turn Ahead the Clock" promotion at a 1998 Seattle Mariners game.
Orbit was replaced with Junction Jack beginning in the 2000 season, with the team's move from the Astrodome to then Enron Field.

On April 13, 2010, a Facebook group called "Bring Back Orbit" was created with the hopes of having the Houston Astros organization to reinstate the mascot. On November 2, 2012, the Astros revealed that after a 12-year absence, Orbit returned as the mascot for the 2013 season in the American League.

Orbit was an active character during the celebrations in Houston on November 3, 2017, after the Astros had won the World Series. He can be seen in various events within Houston and visits schools as part of a team-promoted program against bullying, as well as to promote the importance of baseball. He can be seen wearing the team's main or alternate home uniforms with the team cap or the classic 1970s home uniforms. In 2019, he once again wore the uniforms worn by him and the team in the 1990s.

Beginning in 2015, the Astros Twitter account has a system to determine team wins using GIFs, both of which involve Orbit. If for one to two wins a GIF of Orbit holding a variant of the Flag of Texas will be shown, for three wins or more a short GIF of his 2015 birthday streaking moment on Minute Maid Park is used in its place. In April 2019 the singular win GIF was replaced with one of Orbit waving the flag in the center of the field.

References

Major League Baseball team mascots
Houston Astros
Culture of Houston
Fictional extraterrestrial characters
Mascots introduced in 1990